William Quick may refer to:

William Quick (water polo) (1902-1994), British Olympic water polo player
William F. Quick (1885–1966), American machinist, lawyer, judge and Wisconsin State senator
William Thomas Quick (born 1946), American conservative blogger, novelist and ghostwriter
William Henry Quick (1843–1911), New Zealand businessman, politician, and solicitor